The Tornado was a sailing event on the Sailing at the 1984 Summer Olympics program in Long Beach, Los Angeles County, California. Seven races were scheduled. 40 sailors, on 20 boats, from 20 nations competed.

Results 

DNF = Did Not Finish, DNS= Did Not Start, DSQ = Disqualified, PMS = Premature Start, YMP = Yacht Materially Prejudiced 
 = Male,  = Female

Daily standings

Notes

References 
 

Tornado
Tornado (sailboat)